Astriclypeus is a genus of echinoderms belonging to the family Astriclypeidae.

The species of this genus are found in Japan.

Species:

Astriclypeus elegans 
Astriclypeus mannii 
Astriclypeus miaoliensis 
Astriclypeus pitouensis 
Astriclypeus waiwulunemsis 
Astriclypeus yeliuensis

References

Astriclypeidae
Echinoidea genera